Donna Uchizono is an American choreographer.

Life and career
Donna Uchizono is an American choreographer and is the Artistic Director of Donna Uchizono Company based in New York City. A Guggenheim Fellow and United States Artist awardee, Donna Uchizono has received many awards and grants for her work including both National Endowment for the Arts Company Project Grants (8) and Fellowships (3), MAP Fund (4), Alpert Award, "Bessie" New York Dance and Performance Award, Jerome Foundation (3), National Performance Network Commission and Touring support (4) Creative Capital, both National Dance Project Commission (2) and Touring support (2), Dance Magazine Grant, and Metropolitan Life, among many other awards including extensive New York State and New York City sustained funding.  

She was born on a US Army base in Tokyo, Japan, and grew up in Southern California. In California she danced with the dance companies of Jeff Slayton and Dancers and Lynn Dally and Dancers.  While dancing with Jeff Slayton and Dancers, she received a B.A. in Dance from California State University, Long Beach, California.  In 1986, Uchizono moved to New York City, where she lives and works.

She was a founding member and serves on the Artist Advisory Board at Danspace Project at St. Mark's Church, where she also served as chair from 1990-1995. In 1990 she established the Donna Uchizono Company dedicated to dance performance, where she serves as artistic director.

Honors and awards
2021, 2013, 2012, 2009, 2007, 2005, 2004, 2003, 2002 National Endowment for the Arts
2021, 2020, 2019, 2018, 2016, 2014 New York State Council for the Arts
2019 New Music USA
2018 Dance Advancement Fund (made possible by the Ford Foundation) 
2016 United States Artist Award 
2002, 2004 NEFA's National Dance Project
2002 New York Dance and Performance Award
2002 Creative Capital Grant
1999, 2003, 2004 Rockefeller Foundation MAP Grant
1998 John Simon Guggenheim Fellowship
1996, 00, 04 New York Foundation for the Arts Choreography Fellowship
1995-93 National Endowment for the Arts Choreographer's Fellowship

Works
Selected works include:
2018 March Under an Empty reign	
2016 Sticky Majesty
2016 Break
2013 Fire Underground
2013 Out of Frame
2012 excerpt of Seven
2011 Revisiting Drinking Ivy
2010 longing two
2009 50 Miles from Forsyth
2008 Badlands
2007 Thin Air
2006 Leap to Tall
2006 Moving Liszt
2005 Approaching Green
2005 Hug
2004 Butterflies from my Hand
2002 Low
2001 Featherweight
2000 On Shaky Ground
1999 Invitados
1999 Summer Sprinkle
1999 Opening
1999 State of Heads
1998 Catching
1998 The Wayne Sisters
1998 Teetering High
1997 Me Emociono
1997 Fly Bye Buenos Aires 
1997 Falling Upward
1996 Sipping Air
1995 quietly goes a giant jane
1994 Drinking Ivy
1994 Iron Wings
1994 Angels on Granite
1994 Fax Me
1993 A Sage Passage
1993 Improvisation
1993 The Interview
1993 Four Play
1992 Desiree
1992 Flores Para Lorenzo
1992 Clandestina
1991 The Wayne Brothers
1991 it comes in threes
1991 Talking Ball
1991 Recollection Bruise
1990 San Andreas
1990 Siren
1990 Fault
1990 Pelican Dive
1989 Accommodations
1989 Waving, Not Drowning
1989 short tahitian temper
1989 Leaning Tall
1988 Surfacing
1988 Water on the Knee

References

External links
Donna Uchizono Company

Living people
Modern dancers
Contemporary dance choreographers
Dance in New York City
People from Tokyo
California State University, Long Beach alumni
National Endowment for the Arts Fellows
Long Island University faculty
Bessie Award winners
Year of birth missing (living people)